Alfred Alain Corpuz Labatos (born 30 June 1992) is a Filipino actor working for ABS-CBN. He was first discovered in Eat Bulaga! when he joined the segment That's My Boy on 1998 before becoming a child actor. Labatos was a former cast member of now-defunct, long-running comedy gag show Goin Bulilit. He voiced several characters in Japanese anime series (dubbed in Filipino) acquired by ABS-CBN, most of them previously aired on the now-defunct cable channel Hero TV.

Filmography

Television

Dubbing

References

External links

ABS-CBN personalities
Filipino male television actors
1992 births
People from Caloocan
Star Magic
Living people
Filipino male child actors
Filipino male voice actors